Mei Yaochen (1002–1060) was a Chinese poet of the Song dynasty. He was one of the pioneers of the "new subjective" style of poetry which characterized Song poetry.

Mei Yaochen was born in Xuancheng in present-day Anhui Province. His style name was 'Sheng Yu'. He passed the jinshi exam in 1051 and had a career in the civil service, but was unsuccessful.   He was a prolific poet, with around 3000 works extant; he was popularized as a poet by the younger Ouyang Xiu.

Most of his works are in the shi form, but they are much freer in content than those of the Tang dynasty.   His response to the impossibility of surpassing the Tang poets was to make a virtue of his lack of ambition; his ideal was 平淡 (pingdan), or the pedestrian.   His early verses are often socio-critical, advocating reform along Neo-Confucian lines; later he turned to celebrations of ordinary life and verses mourning the deaths of his first wife and several of his children.
An example is his poem translated into English by Kenneth Rexroth as "An Excuse for Not Returning the Visit of a Friend."

See also

Chinese poetry
Song poetry
Classical Chinese poetry
Chinese literature
Culture of the Song Dynasty

Notes

References
 Ci hai bian ji wei yuan hui. Ci hai. Shanghai: Shanghai ci shu chu ban she, 1979.
Jonathan Chaves. MEI YAO-CH'EN AND THE DEVELOPMENT OF EARLY SUNG POETRY. New York:  Columbia University Press. 1976.

1002 births
1060 deaths
11th-century Chinese poets
People from Xuancheng
Poets from Anhui
Song dynasty poets